4-Aminophenylmercuric acetate (CH3CO2HgC6H4NH2, also known as 4-(Acetoxymercurio)aniline or APMA), is an organomercurial compound and thiol-blocking reagent used in experimental biology and chemistry to activate matrix metalloproteinases and collagenase proteolytic enzymes. The material is highly toxic.

Properties

APMA has a molecular weight of 351.8 g/mol and appears as a white powder with a slight yellowish cast. Its melting temperature is 163–165 °C. APMA is soluble in water to concentrations as high as 5 mM, and in DMSO to concentrations of 10 M or more. In 100% acetic acid, an APMA solution of 50 mg/mL is a light translucent yellow.

Protein modification

APMA is known to activate matrix metalloproteinase enzymes and collagenase. APMA activates proteolytic enzymes by reacting with cysteines at the amino terminal domains that bind zinc, near the location of the enzyme active site.

Toxicity

APMA and APMA vapors are highly toxic or fatal in contact with skin, or if inhaled or swallowed.

See also
 4-Chloromercuribenzoic acid - an organomercury compound that is used as a protease inhibitor
 Phenylmercury acetate - a structurally related organomercury compound historically used as a preservative in paints

References

Acetates
Organomercury compounds